Tawitawi Island (also spelled Tawi Tawi or Tawi-Tawi) is a Philippine island in the Sulu Archipelago between the Sulu Sea and Celebes Sea, about  east of Borneo. It is the main island of Tawi-Tawi Province.

It is hilly and heavily wooded, with splashes of white sandy beaches and rock-bound coasts.

The island is subdivided into 4 municipalities (Bongao, Languyan, Panglima Sugala, and Tandubas). The inhabitants are mostly Sama people, speaking Sama–Bajaw languages and of Muslim conviction.

References

External links
 

Sulu Archipelago